Serapias parviflora, the small-flowered tongue-orchid, is a species of orchid native to the Mediterranean Basin and the Atlantic coast of Europe.

Description 
At the base of the stem, there are 4–7 keeled, linear leaves, and 1–3 bract-like leaves further up the stem. The 3–8 flowers (rarely up to 12) are arranged in a spike.

Distribution 
Serapias parviflora is found natively across the Mediterranean Basin from the Iberian Peninsula to the Aegean Sea, as well as in the Canary Islands and along the Atlantic coast of France. It was discovered in 1989 at Rame Head in Cornwall (United Kingdom), and may have dispersed there naturally. That colony disappeared after 20 years, but in 2021, fifteen plants were discovered in the 11th-floor roof garden of Nomura International's office building in the City of London.

References

External links 
 
 

parviflora
Orchids of Europe
Flora of England
Flora of the Canary Islands
Plants described in 1837